Porri is a  commune in the Haute-Corse department of France on the island of Corsica.

Porri may also refer to:

 Porri (surname)